Ana María de Campos y Cubillán de Fuentes (April 2, 1796 – October 17, 1828) was a resistance fighter in the Venezuelan War of Independence. She was given the honor of "heroine", and is known as a "warrior" and a "martyr".

Early life
Ana María was the daughter of Domingo José de Campos y Perozo de Cervantes, and María Ana Cubillán de Fuentes y Vera. From a young age she was a supporter of the expulsion of the Spanish government.

She came from one of the most aristocratic families in the region, and received the limited education that was traditional for women in such families, which was primarily restricted to the study of Catholicism. Despite this, she became learned in the arts of society and even in the chivalric code, becoming "known as an accomplished Amazona".

Within high society, Ana María was indirectly exposed to the writings and liberal thoughts of the Age of Enlightenment, and from a young age was reported as having "a thirst for liberty, equality and fraternity", a thirst which would give her reason to resist the Royalist counter-coup of 1821-23.

Resistance campaigns and arrest
Sympathetic to, and then active in, independence causes from childhood, Ana María opened up the rooms of her large family home for the organisation of these forces, and plotted with them.

She is perhaps best known for her actions during the Royalist occupation of Lake Maracaibo, headed up by Field Marshal Francisco Tomás Morales. After hearing of Ana María's attempts to aid the revolution, in September 1822, Morales accused her of organising clandestine meetings to overthrow the crown and had her arrested. One of the pieces of evidence given was something she said in one of the secret meetings: "Si Morales no capitula, monda!" — in the vernacular of the time, "If Morales does not surrender, he dies". She was personally questioned by Morales and confessed to saying the phrase, which had already become a popular chant in Maracaibo.

She refused to apologise to Spain, and was convicted and sentenced to a "public flagellation". This entailed riding through the streets topless, specifically on a donkey instead of on horseback, turning the symbol into one of disgrace. She was lashed at the same time by the public executioner, Valentín Aguirre. It is reported that after every lash he asked her if she wanted to repent, and every time she answered, "Si no capitula, monda". After enduring the torture, she was released. However, the injuries sustained would eventually be the cause of her death.

Battle of Lake Maracaibo
Though beaten, Ana María lived several years longer. The year after her arrest and torture, the battle that she had sought for happened, the Battle of Lake Maracaibo, on July 24, 1823. Still weak from the torture, she took a supporting role in the battle. The revolutionaries won the battle, securing independence for Maracaibo, and forcing Morales to surrender.

Death
Ana María died at age 32, five years after the victory at Lake Maracaibo, from an epileptic seizure that came about from her torture injuries, on the shores of Lake Maracaibo on October 17, 1828.

Legacy
Numerous sites in Maracaibo are named for Ana María, including a street, a public square, and a petrochemical complex. A monument in the public square bearing her name depicts Ana María riding topless on a donkey as a man wields a whip behind her.

In areas of Zulia, the state of Ana María's birth, the bicentennial of her birth was celebrated with a large festival. There was also a push to create more biographies of her at this time, and the Ana María Campos Orchestra was formed. A popular tune in Venezuela was composed and dedicated to Ana María, and is used to commemorate her. It is called the "Canción de primavera", which translates as "Spring Song". In 2016, the Legislative Council of Zulia established the Order Ana María Campos, which is bestowed annually on local women "who actively fight for gender equality and women's empowerment in the different social branches of the country".

Notes

References

1796 births
1828 deaths
Women in the Venezuelan War of Independence
People from Zulia
Venezuelan War of Independence
Women in 19th-century warfare
Women in war in South America